Tatiana Alexeyevna Golikova (Russian: Татьяна Алексеевна Голикова; born 9 February 1966) is a Russian politician and economist who serves as the Deputy Prime Minister of Russia for Social Policy, Labour, Health and Pension Provision since 2018.

From 2007 to 2012, she served as the Minister of Health and Social Development and Chairwoman of the Account Chamber of Russia from 2013 to 2018.

Early life and education
Golikova was born on 9 February 1966 in Mytishchi, Russian SFSR.
She graduated from the Plekhanov Institute of the National Economy with a specialization in labour economics in 1987.

Career
Golikova was an economist in the State Budget Department at the Finance Ministry from 1990 to 1992. She moved on to hold the post of Chief Economist in the State Budget Department at the Finance Ministry from 1992 to 1995 and was then Deputy Head of State Budget Department at the Finance Ministry from 1995 to 1998. From April to August 1998, she held the post of Head of State Budget Department at the Finance Ministry, before becoming Head of the Budget Policy Department from August 1998 to July 1999. She was deputy Finance Minister from July 1999 to 2002 and First Deputy Finance Minister from 2002 to 2004. She was a Deputy Finance Minister from 2004 to September 2007.

Minister
Golikova was appointed Minister of Health and Social Development in September 2007, at the request of Vladimir Putin. She had the additional responsibility of Deputy Chair of the Federal Antinarcotics Service (FSKN). In 2012 she resigned from office.

Deputy prime minister

On 18 May 2018, Golikova was appointed deputy prime minister in Dmitry Medvedev's Second Cabinet. On 21 January 2020, she maintained her position in Mikhail Mishustin's Cabinet. She was appointed the head of the Emergency Response Centre on preventing the import and spread of the Coronavirus in Russia later the same month.

Sanctions
In December 2022 the European Union sanctioned Golikova in relation to the 2022 Russian invasion of Ukraine.

Personal life
Golikova is married to Viktor Khristenko, the former Minister of Industry and Trade. They married in 2003. She has earned the nickname "Miss Budget".

Awards and honours
Russia:
 "For Services to the Fatherland" in the 2nd Degree (2001). 
 "For Services to the Fatherland" in the 1st Degree (2004)
 Order of Honour (2006)
 Order of Friendship (2006).

Corruption allegations 
Golikova has been widely accused of corruption by several Russian media outlets, mainly for her alleged connections to the Pharmstandard, which is  producer of the heavily-hyped drug Arbidol. After these allegations she was nicknamed "Madam Arbidol".

In 2022, the Anti-Corruption Foundation released an investigation claiming that Golikova, her husband and stepson owned an airplane; golf clubs in Spain and Russia; real estate in Spain, Portugal, French Riviera and Russia.

References

External links 

 Russia Profile's Golikova Biography

1966 births
Living people
People from Mytishchi
Plekhanov Russian University of Economics alumni
Government ministers of Russia
Russian women economists
Women government ministers of Russia
Deputy heads of government of the Russian Federation
21st-century Russian politicians
20th-century  Russian economists
21st-century  Russian economists
21st-century Russian women politicians
1st class Active State Councillors of the Russian Federation